Akershus Kollektivterminaler FKF is a county agency responsible for owning and operating major bus terminals in Akershus, Norway. It is a subsidiary of Akershus County Municipality, and operates 19 bus terminals, in addition to some adjacent park and ride facilities. The agency is responsible for all bus terminals with seven or more bus stops, and those in conjunction with railway stations. Smaller terminals and bus stops are operated by the Norwegian Public Roads Administration. The largest terminal is Oslo Bus Terminal, located in the heart of the city center, and owned by the subsidiary Vaterland Bussterminal.

Terminals

References

Bus transport in Akershus
Organisations based in Skedsmo
Government agencies established in 1999
1999 establishments in Norway